Liwqiyuq Punta (Quechua liwqi gull, -yuq a suffix, liwqiyuq "with gulls" also spelled Leukheyoj Punta) is a  mountain in the Bolivian Andes. It is located in the Chuquisaca Department, Tomina Province, Sopachuy Municipality.

References 

Mountains of Chuquisaca Department